The WABA Champions Cup, between 2011 and 2012 known as the West Asian Basketball League (WABL), was the West Asian club championship for basketball organized by West Asia Basketball Association, and took place every year, It also served as a qualifying tournament for the FIBA Asia Champions Cup.

Champions

Titles by team

Titles by country

References

WABA Champions Cup - Roll of Honor

External links
www.asia-basket.com

 
International club basketball competitions
Basketball club competitions in Asia
WABA Championship